Below is a list of Donald Trump's appointments to the Department of State.

Color key 
 Denotes appointees serving in offices that did not require Senate confirmation.

 Denotes appointees confirmed by the Senate.

 Denotes appointees awaiting Senate confirmation.

 Denotes appointees serving in an acting capacity.

 Denotes appointees who have left office or offices which have been disbanded.

 Denotes nominees who were withdrawn prior to being confirmed or assuming office.

Appointments

Previous officeholders

Notes

References 

 Trump
State